The Western Canada Concept Party of BC is a provincial political party in British Columbia, Canada. It was the British Columbia branch of the Western Canada Concept, a political party that operated at the federal level, advocating the separation of the four western provinces of Canada and the formation of a new country comprising British Columbia, Alberta, Saskatchewan and Manitoba.

The party's leader until 2013 was Doug Christie, a far right lawyer best known for defending Holocaust deniers.

In the May 5, 1983, British Columbia provincial election, the party nominated 18 candidates. They won 14,185 votes, or 0.86% of the popular vote. Another western separatist party, the Western National Party, ran two candidates, who collected 474 votes (0.03% of the total).

In the October 22, 1986 election, the party nominated one candidate, who won 322 votes, or 0.02% of the popular vote.

In the October 17, 1991 election, the party nominated five candidates, who collected 651 votes, or 0.04% of the popular vote.

In the May 17, 2005 election, the party nominated two candidates, who collected a total of 374 votes, 0.02% of the popular vote. Doug Christie won 202 votes (0.76%) in Saanich South, and Pattie O'Brien won 172 votes (0.66%) in Malahat-Juan de Fuca.

In 2005, Christie established a western separatist party to operate at the federal political level, the Western Block Party.

The WCC is not affiliated with the Separation Party of Alberta or the Western Independence Party of Saskatchewan. Officials in these parties have distanced themselves from Christie - for example, they do not include links to the WCC or WBP on their websites even though the SPA and WIPS do link to one another.

See also

 List of British Columbia political parties
 BC Refederation Party

Provincial political parties in British Columbia
Secessionist organizations in Canada
Conservative parties in Canada
1980 establishments in British Columbia
Political parties established in 1980